Mehrab is an Iranian-designed, mid-range surface-to-air missile based on the Sayyad-2. The first ninety units have been tested and unveiled.

The missile can target goals in land, sea, and air.

Electronic warfare 
It can change targets to disrupt missile tracking systems. It is claimed that it can survive electronic warfare. The Mehrab is designed to abandon its primary target and track the source of the disruptive signal, redirecting itself toward that source (note: this is usually called 'home-on-jam').  In the absence of disruptive signals, the rocket sets its course using radar waves sent by its flight commander, waves that are reflected from the target and received by the missile. It tracks the reflected waves; aiming to hit their source.

Design 
The missile uses solid fuel as its propellant. The missile uses an altered version of the Zdsamanhay radar system to target an enemy that is trying to disrupt its flight path. Systems such as the Electronic Akhlagar send signals that distract enemy missiles.

Testing and deployment 
The Iranian frigate Damavand or Jamaran operationally tested its Mehrab systems and equipment in the Caspian Sea. The frigate is now equipped with this advanced missile system. Earlier, a missile-equipped naval destroyer was found in the waters south of Iran. Perhaps the main reasons for equipping these two frigates with this missile defense system are their high power and high speed through utilizing advanced radar. Normally, such ships are known for low speed and massive size. Ships using such systems are protected against cruise missiles, aircraft and enemy ships.

References 

Surface-to-air missiles of Iran
Naval surface-to-air missiles
Guided missiles of Iran